Paulette Bray-Bouquet Weber was a Belgian-French aviator who often piloted hot-air balloons.

Career
A student of Georges Suire, Weber made her first flight in a hot-air balloon in 1928. In 1930 she gained her license as pilot, second-class, having completed 14 balloon ascents, including four solo and two at night.

On 30 December 30, 1931, she left from Saint Cloud in the "Maison et Mallet" Trophy, competing for the distance, but because of the snow on her aircraft, weighing it down, she was forced to land in Châtillon-sur-Seine and abandon the race. She then returned to Paris by train. In 1931 she was documented in the magazine L'Aérophile, which classified her "among the pilots who 'really' carry out air travel". At that time she had made 28 ascents, including 22 solo and four at night, and had participated in the Juchmès and Mallet cups, but without victory. In 1934 she copiloted with Suire a test hot-air balloon before the Gordon Bennett Cup race in Warsaw to show the contestants how the wind blows. Two years later she came third at the Le Mans International Hot Air Balloon Cup, having travelled 250 km., and in November 1937 she won the "Aumont-Thiéville" cup with 242 km.

On 1 May 1946, in Paris at Place de la Concorde, demonstration flights were carried out in a balloon, with various pilots, including Paulette Weber, who was returning to pilot the balloon for the first time since 1939. On this occasion, the journalist Suzy Mathis published an article on the Weber on the central page of Aviation française, where they repurposed passages from a previous interview that Mathis had done with Weber for Les dimanches de la femme. It also summarized some of her records:

Distance record (750 km) Bailleul—Regensburg
Female distance record (440 km) Gennevilliers—Eifel
Nord-Spherique Cup, with 2500 km in 4 ascents
Planchon-Ramade Cup, 2nd place
Alfred-Leblanc Cup, 2nd place

The interview ended with a Weber statement: "Balloon tourism is the king of tourism."

Death
Weber died in October 1954, due to progressive loss of hydrogen due to the porous coating of her balloon, a common defect at the time. Despite having thrown all its ballast overboard, the aircraft sank into the waters of the North Sea. It was her 235th ascent in a balloon.

References

Bibliography

External links
 Paulette Weber - Press review on Press Museum
 Paulette Weber - Search articles on Gallica/BNF

1954 deaths
Aviation pioneers
Aviators killed in aviation accidents or incidents
Balloon flight record holders
Belgian aviation record holders
Belgian balloonists
Belgian women aviators
Flight distance record holders
French air racers
French balloonists
French women aviation record holders
Naturalized citizens of France
People who died at sea
Victims of aviation accidents or incidents in Europe
Victims of aviation accidents or incidents in 1954
1901 births